Riverdale is a city in southern Weber County, Utah, United States. The population was 8,426 at the 2010 census. It is part of the Ogden–Clearfield, Utah Metropolitan Statistical Area.

Geography
According to the United States Census Bureau, the city has a total area of 4.4 square miles (11.5 km2), all land.

Demographics

As of the census of 2000, there were 7,656 people, 2,806 households, and 2,045 families residing in the city. The population density was 1,726.1 people per square mile (665.8/km2). There were 2,970 housing units at an average density of 669.6 per square mile (258.3/km2). The racial makeup of the city was 91.95% White, 1.48% African American, 0.60% Native American, 1.38% Asian, 0.30% Pacific Islander, 2.32% from other races, and 1.96% from two or more races. Hispanic or Latino of any race were 6.37% of the population.

There were 2,806 households, out of which 36.2% had children under the age of 18 living with them, 57.8% were married couples living together, 11.0% had a female householder with no husband present, and 27.1% were non-families. 22.3% of all households were made up of individuals, and 5.8% had someone living alone who was 65 years of age or older. The average household size was 2.73 and the average family size was 3.21.

In the city, the population was spread out, with 28.2% under the age of 18, 14.2% from 18 to 24, 28.2% from 25 to 44, 20.5% from 45 to 64, and 8.9% who were 65 years of age or older. The median age was 29 years. For every 100 females, there were 98.7 males. For every 100 females age 18 and over, there were 98.1 males.

The median income for a household in the city was $44,375, and the median income for a family was $49,453. Males had a median income of $32,389 versus $23,635 for females. The per capita income for the city was $18,627. About 6.9% of families and 8.8% of the population were below the poverty line, including 14.3% of those under age 18 and 1.2% of those age 65 or over.

History

Once called "Stringtown" due to the early homes being strung along a single road and the Weber River, Riverdale was also known as "Jack Thompson's Settlement" and "Union" before the name of Riverdale was given to the town.

The first settlers in the community were James Graham, his sons George and Robert, and other members of the Graham family. They farmed in the area as early as 1850. Elisha Lane located nearby, as did William Farley, and Rufus Allen. Other early settlers of Riverdale included Adam Fife, Alexander Patterson, Warren Gould Child Sr, Thomas Slater, Richard Woolsey, John Child, John C. Thompson, William Stimpson, Myron Barber Child, Richard Dye, and George Ritter.

Daniel Burch built a grist mill along the eastern bank of the Weber River in 1853. John Taylor, an LDS apostle, purchased and expanded the mill in 1858. Other industries began establishing, including match manufacturing (by Hugh Findlay, who later served as the settlement's first teacher), a blacksmith shop, and a canning factory.

The town of Riverdale was finally incorporated on March 4, 1946.

See also

 List of cities and towns in Utah

References

External links

 

Cities in Utah
Cities in Weber County, Utah
Ogden–Clearfield metropolitan area
Populated places established in 1853